Abdulellah Al-Amer (born 28 February 1990) is a Saudi Arabian football player who plays as a center back.

External links
 

Living people
1990 births
Association football defenders
Saudi Arabian footballers
Al-Tai FC players
Al-Faisaly FC players
Al-Qadsiah FC players
Al-Shoulla FC players
Place of birth missing (living people)
Saudi First Division League players
Saudi Professional League players